The 1954 Idaho Vandals football team represented the University of Idaho in the 1954 college football season. The Vandals were led by first-year head coach Skip Stahley and were members of the Pacific Coast Conference. Three home games were played on campus at Neale Stadium in Moscow, with another in Boise at old Bronco Stadium at Boise Junior College.

Idaho compiled a 4–5 overall record and were 1–2 in the PCC. After five losses to open, they won their last four games. Six of the nine games were shutouts, with three wins and three losses. The four-game winning streak was the program's longest in decades.
 
In the Battle of the Palouse with neighbor Washington State, the 0–5 Vandals blanked the Cougars  in Pullman on October 23 for Stahley's first victory as head coach. It was Idaho's first win in the series in 29 years; the next came ten years later in 1964.

The annual game with Montana was not played this year; outside of wartime years (without teams), it was the first break in the rivalry in forty years. Idaho was three games into an eight-game streak over the Grizzlies and retained the Little Brown Stein until 1960.

After the win in Pullman, Idaho defeated favored Utah in Salt Lake City, then shut out North Dakota in Moscow and BYU in Boise.

A former head coach at Toledo and an assistant at Washington and in the NFL with the Cardinals, Stahley was hired in February, at an annual salary of $9,000. He remained as Idaho's head coach for eight seasons, then continued as athletic director for three more years.

Schedule

All-conference
No Vandals were on the All-PCC team or the second team. Honorable mention were fullback Wilbur Gary and guard Burdette Hess.

NFL Draft
One senior from the 1954 Vandals was selected in the 1955 NFL Draft:

One sophomore was selected in the 1957 NFL Draft:

Four members of the freshman team were selected in the 1958 NFL Draft:

List of Idaho Vandals in the NFL Draft

References

External links
Gem of the Mountains: 1955 University of Idaho yearbook – 1954 football season 
Go Mighty Vandals – 1954 football season
Official game program: Idaho at Washington State – October 23, 1954
Official game program: Idaho at Utah – October 30, 1954
Idaho Argonaut – student newspaper – 1954 editions

Idaho
Idaho Vandals football seasons
Idaho Vandals football